Events from the year 1973 in South Korea.

Incumbents
President: Park Chung-hee 
Prime Minister: Kim Jong-pil

Events

Births

 February 11 - Jeon Do-yeon.
 March 20 - Jung Woo-sung.
 June 30 - Chan Ho Park.

See also
List of South Korean films of 1973
Years in Japan
Years in North Korea

References

 
South Korea
Years of the 20th century in South Korea
1970s in South Korea
South Korea